Floirac is a commune in the Charente-Maritime department in Nouvelle-Aquitaine, southwestern France. On 1 January 2018, the former commune of Saint-Romain-sur-Gironde was merged into Floirac. Floirac is situated near the Gironde estuary, 27 km southeast of Royan.

Population

See also
 Communes of the Charente-Maritime department

References

External links
 

Communes of Charente-Maritime